Crunchin' is an album by American jazz trumpeter Wallace Roney which was recorded in 1993 and released on the Muse label.

Reception

The AllMusic review by Ron Wynn stated, "Trumpeter Wallace Roney sounds poignant and fabulous throughout the eight tracks on his latest release. ... Alto saxophonist Antonio Hart chimes in with equal facility and spark, while Geri Allen shows that she is just as outstanding as an accompanist on standards and hard bop as in trios or as a leader".

Track listing
 "Woody 'n' You" (Dizzy Gillespie) − 4:46
 "What's New?" (Bob Haggart, Johnny Burke) − 7:51	
 "Angel Eyes" (Matt Dennis, Earl Brent) − 6:22	
 "Swing Spring" (Miles Davis) − 5:39
 "Time After Time" (Jule Styne, Sammy Cahn) − 5:55	
 "We See" (Thelonious Monk) − 6:53
 "You Stepped Out of a Dream" (Nacio Herb Brown, Gus Kahn) − 4:16
 "Misterioso" (Monk) − 12:47

Personnel 
Wallace Roney − trumpet
Antonio Hart − alto saxophone (tracks 1, 2, 4 & 6-8)
Geri Allen − piano 
Ron Carter − bass
Kenny Washington − drums

References 

1993 albums
Wallace Roney albums
Albums recorded at Van Gelder Studio
Muse Records albums